is a Japanese footballer who plays as a forward for NJ/NY Gotham FC and the Japan women's national team. Yokoyama goes by he/him and singular they pronouns.

Club career
Yokoyama was born in Tama, Tokyo, on 13 August 1993. After graduating from high school, he joined Okayama Yunogo Belle in 2012. In 2014, he moved to L.League Division 2 club AC Nagano Parceiro. He became top scorer in 2014 and 2015. The club was also promoted to Division 1 from 2016. In 2016 season, he was selected Best Eleven. In July 2017, he moved to German Bundesliga club Frankfurt. In July 2018, Yokoyama returned to AC Nagano Parceiro. In December 2019, he signed with the Washington Spirit.

National team career
In 2010, Yokoyama was selected Japan U-17 national team for 2010 U-17 World Cup. He played 6 games and scored 6 goals, and Japan won 2nd place. He received one of the ten 2010 FIFA Puskás Awards nominations for his winning goal in the semifinals against North Korea, which made the headlines and was compared to Diego Maradona's second goal against England in the 1986 World Cup. In 2012 he was  also a member of Japan U-20 national team for 2012 U-20 World Cup which Japan won 3rd place. In March 2015, he was selected  Japan national team for 2015 Algarve Cup. At this competition, on 6 March, he debuted and scored a goal against Portugal. In 2018, he played at 2018 Asian Cup. He scored 4 goals include 2 goals at semifinal and a goal at final, and Japan won the championship.

Personal life
In June 2021, Yokoyama came out as a transgender man in a video interview conducted by former Nadeshiko striker Yuki Nagasato; Yokoyama decided to come out publicly after encouragement from his girlfriend.

Club statistics

National team statistics

Honors
 Team
 AFC U-19 Women's Championship
 Champion (1) : 2011

 Individual
 2010 FIFA U-17 Women's World Cup : Silver Ball, Bronze Shoe
 2014 L.League Division 2 : Top scorers

References

External links
 

Japan Football Association
 

1993 births
Living people
People from Tama, Tokyo
Association football people from Tokyo Metropolis
Japanese women's footballers
Japan women's international footballers
Nadeshiko League players
Okayama Yunogo Belle players
AC Nagano Parceiro Ladies players
Women's association football forwards
2019 FIFA Women's World Cup players
Washington Spirit players
National Women's Soccer League players
Transgender sportsmen
Japanese LGBT sportspeople
Transgender men
LGBT association football players
NJ/NY Gotham FC players